Primula scandinavica is a species of flowering plant in the family Primulaceae.

Description 
Primula scandinavica is a perennial plant, which possesses a basal rosette of leaves. The leaves are around 2–4 cm long, narrow at the base, yet broad and rounded at the tip. Flowers are based on the top of stalks ranging from 4–10 cm tall. Petals are pink in colour, with the eye of the flower being yellow.

Distribution 
The native range of P. scandinavica is confined to Scandinavia where it endemic to both Norway and Sweden.

Habitat 
Primula scandinavica grows on calcareous rocks. It can be found in coastal habitats such as rocky outcrops, stony shores and cliffs. 

It also grows in mountainous and alpine habitats, however populations decline where grazing livestock isn't present.

Image gallery

References 

scandinavica